The 2013–14 South Pacific cyclone season was a slightly below average tropical cyclone season, with six tropical cyclones occurring within the basin between 160°E and 120°W. The season ran from November 1, 2013, to April 30, 2014, however, the first four tropical disturbances occurred during October 2013 and were included as a part of the season. During the season, tropical cyclones were officially monitored by the Fiji Meteorological Service (FMS), Australian Bureau of Meteorology (BoM) and New Zealand's MetService. The United States Joint Typhoon Warning Center (JTWC) and other national meteorological services including Météo-France and NOAA also monitored the basin during the season. During the season there were 21 significant tropical disturbances were assigned a number and an "F" suffix by the FMS's Regional Specialized Meteorological Center in Nadi, Fiji (RSMC Nadi), including the remnants of Tropical Cyclone Hadi from the Australian region. The BoM, MetService and RSMC Nadi all estimated sustained wind speeds over a period of 10-minutes and used the Australian tropical cyclone intensity scale, while the JTWC estimated sustained winds over a 1-minute period, which are subsequently compared to the Saffir–Simpson hurricane wind scale (SSHS).



Seasonal forecasts

Ahead of the cyclone season, the BoM, the FMS, MetService, the New Zealand National Institute of Water and Atmospheric Research (NIWA) and various other Pacific Meteorological services, all contributed towards the Island Climate Update tropical cyclone outlook that was released during October 2013. The outlook took into account the ENSO neutral conditions that had been observed across the Pacific and analogue seasons that had ENSO neutral conditions occurring during the season. The outlook called for a near average number of tropical cyclones for the 2013–14 season, with eight to twelve named tropical cyclones, to occur between 135°E and 120°W compared to an average of 10. At least four of the tropical cyclones were expected to become category 3 severe tropical cyclones, while three could become category 4 severe tropical cyclones, they also noted that a Category 5 severe tropical cyclone was unlikely to occur. In addition to contributing towards the Island Climate Update outlook, the FMS and the BoM both issued their own seasonal forecasts for the South Pacific region.

The BoM issued 3 seasonal forecasts for the South Pacific region between 142.5°E and 120°W, one for the Western Southern Pacific region between 142.5°E and 165°E and one for the Eastern Southern Pacific region between 165°E and 120°W. They noted that the tropical Pacific Ocean was currently experiencing neutral ENSO conditions which meant that there was no strong shift expected in the average location of tropical cyclone formation. They also noted that there was nothing in the broad climate drivers to suggest anything, but a typical tropical cyclone season for the South Pacific region. As a result, they predicted that the South Pacific region as a whole, would experience near average tropical cyclone activity during the coming season with a 48% chance of it being above average. The Western region was predicted to have 56% chance of being above average while the Eastern region had a 47% chance of being above average. Within their outlook the FMS predicted that between four and eight tropical cyclones, would occur within the basin compared to an average of around 7.4 cyclones. At least two of the tropical cyclones were expected to become category 3 severe tropical cyclones, while 1-2 might intensify into a category 4 or 5 severe tropical cyclones. They also reported that the tropical cyclone genesis trough was expected to be located near to and to the west of the International Date Line. This was based on the expected and predicted ENSO conditions, and the existence of the Pacific warm pool of sub-surface temperature anomalies in this region.

The FMS and Island Climate Update tropical cyclone outlooks both assessed, the risk of a tropical cyclone affecting a certain island or territory. As the tropical cyclone genesis trough of low pressure was expected to be located near to and to the west of the International Date Line, normal or slightly above normal activity was expected for areas near the dateline. It was also predicted that activity between Vanuatu and New Caledonia, as well as east of the International Date Line to be normal or below normal during the season. The Island Climate Update Outlook predicted that Vanuatu and New Caledonia had a reduced chance of being affected by multiple tropical cyclones. The Cook Islands, Fiji, Papua New Guinea, Tuvalu, Tokelau, Samoan Islands, Solomon Islands, Tonga, Wallis and Futuna and French Polynesia's Austral and Society Islands were all predicted to have a normal chance of being affected by a tropical cyclone. Niue and New Zealand were predicted to face an elevated risk while French Polynesia's Tuamotu Archipelago and Marquesas Islands, Kiribati and the Pitcairn Islands, had an unlikely chance of being affected by a tropical cyclone. The FMS outlook predicted that the Cook and Samoan Islands, Tokelau and Niue had a below average risk of being affected by a tropical cyclone. The Solomon Islands, Wallis and Futuna, Vanuatu and Tonga were predicted to face an average risk of being affected by a tropical cyclone. New Caledonia, Tuvalu and Fiji were predicted to face an above average chance of being affected by a tropical cyclone. The FMS also predicted that there was an increased risk of severe tropical cyclones, affecting the region this year when compared to the previous season. There was a very high risk of Wallis and Futuna, Tonga, Fiji and New Caledonia being affected by a severe tropical cyclone. The Samoan Islands, Tokelau, Niue, Solomon Islands and Vanuatu had a high risk, while the Cook Islands had a low to moderate risk of being affected by a severe tropical cyclone.

Seasonal summary

Ahead of the season formally starting on November 1, 2013, three tropical depressions and a tropical disturbance developed, within the Coral Sea during October. Tropical Disturbance 01F developed on October 19, to the southeast of the Solomon Islands and moved westwards, as a small compact system before it was last noted during the next day. Tropical Depression 02F was first noted on October 19, to the northeast of Suva, Fiji, over the next couple of days the system rapidly consolidated further. However, despite having a good chance of developing into a tropical cyclone, atmospheric convection surrounding the system failed to consolidate enough. The system was subsequently last noted on October 26, as it moved through the island nation of Vanuatu. Tropical Depression 03F was briefly noted on October 22, to the northeast of Honiara on the Solomon Island of Guadalcanal. Tropical Depression 04F developed on October 25, to the southeast of Honiara and affected the islands before RSMC Nadi issued its final advisory on the system during October 27, as it was not expected to develop into a tropical cyclone.

Systems

Tropical Depression 02F

Over the next day the system moved westwards within an area of low vertical wind shear and rapidly consolidated further and became a tropical depression during October 20. After the system had started to move towards the south-southwest and continued to consolidate, the Joint Typhoon Warning Center issued a Tropical Cyclone Formation Alert for the system during October 21. However, this alert was cancelled during the next day after satellite imagery revealed a poorly defined low level circulation center, with unorganized atmospheric convection that had not consolidated and vertical wind shear over the system had started to increase. RSMC Nadi subsequently issued their final warning on the system during October 23, as the system weakened into an area of low pressure over the islands of Vanuatu. However, the remnant area of low pressure was monitored until October 26, as it moved through Vanuatu.

Between October 23–24, heavy rainfall associated with the system, caused flooding and landslides on the island of Paama in Malampa Province. Because of the islands geography, impacts were reported to most villages on the island with specific damage reported to homes, roads, a school and the islands air strip. Other impacts included over 160 food gardens being destroyed and the ground water supply was contaminated.

Severe Tropical Cyclone Ian

During January 2, RSMC Nadi reported that Tropical Disturbance 07F had developed to the southeast of Futuna Island. Over the next three days the system gradually developed further underneath an upper-level ridge of high pressure, within an area of moderate vertical wind shear, as it slowly moved towards the southwest. Late on January 5, the JTWC designated the system as Tropical Cyclone 07P, before RSMC Nadi named the system Ian, after it had become a category 1 tropical cyclone on the Australian scale.

Tropical Cyclone June

During January 13, the FMS reported that Tropical Disturbance 08F had developed, along a surface trough of low pressure to the southeast of the Solomon Island Makira. Over the next couple of days the system moved south-westwards and moved into the Australian region during January 15, where it was classified as a monsoonal low. The disturbance, however, exited that basin on January 16 without upgrading it to a tropical cyclone. The RSMC Nadi had reported that the system intensified into a Category 1 tropical cyclone and was named June the next day.

June caused at least one fatality in New Caledonia, possibly two.

Tropical Cyclone Edna

During February 4, Tropical Cyclone Edna moved into the basin, just after deep convection surrounding the system had significantly improved and it had re-intensified into a tropical cyclone. Over the next day the system was steered to the south-southeast by a mid-level ridge of high pressure and affected the French Territory of New Caledonia.

Tropical Cyclone Kofi

This was quite close to Tropical Depression 14F, and JTWC appear to have regarded them as the same system. There had also been severe flooding in Central and Eastern parts of Fiji Islands on February 27. During Kofi's duration, the system submerged many homes in the Fiji Islands.

The strengthened to Category 1 as it approached Tonga on 1 March, causing sea flooding but no major damage.

Severe Tropical Cyclone Lusi

Over the next two days the system moved towards the north-northwest and slowly consolidated, as atmospheric convection wrapped into the systems low level circulation center, before RSMC Nadi reported during March 9, that the system had developed into a tropical depression. It later strengthened into a category 1 tropical cyclone. The system killed 10 people in Vanuatu and damaged or destroyed 40 structures. The remnants of the system impacted New Zealand, causing NZ$4 million of damage.

Tropical Cyclone Mike

Over the next few days the system gradually developed further before early on March 19, RSMC Nadi reported the system had become a category 1 tropical cyclone on the Australian scale and named it Mike. The JTWC subsequently initiated advisories on the system and assigned it the designation Tropical Cyclone 20P. Later that day RSMC Nadi and the JTWC issued their final advisories on Mike, as it moved below 25S and transitioned into an extratropical cyclone.

Other systems
The first numbered tropical disturbance of the year developed within an area of low vertical wind shear, to the southeast of the Solomon Islands on October 19. The system subsequently moved westwards as a small compact system, before it was during October 20 as it dissipated to the north of Vanuatu. The system was last noted during October 22, after convection surrounding the centre had significantly reduced. Over the next couple of days the system affected the Solomon Islands, before it was last noted during October 27, as it was not expected to develop into a Category 1 tropical cyclone. A reanalysis of these three systems was performed by Steve Young during April 2014, who felt that these three systems represented one weak system that existed between October 18–27, near the Solomon Islands.

During that day the system moved towards the southeast and passed over the Fijian island of Viti Levu. After passing over Fiji the system continued to move south-eastwards and developed into a tropical depression during December 11. On December 23, RSMC Nadi reported that Tropical Disturbance 06F had developed under an upper-level ridge of high pressure, within an area of moderate vertical wind shear to the northeast of the Santa Cruz Islands. Over the next few days the system moved south-eastwards and influenced the "moist easterly wind flow" over the Fijian Islands until it was last noted during December 29.

Over the next day the system moved westwards and developed into a tropical depression, while located within an area of low to moderate vertical windshear. Over the next couple of days the JTWC also monitored the system as a subtropical system that was becoming tropical, before it was last noted by RSMC Nadi on January 24. The system lied within an area of moderate to high vertical windshear to the north of an upper-level ridge of high pressure. Over the next couple of days the system moved westwards into an area of low vertical windshear and the Australian region, where it developed into Tropical Cyclone Dylan during January 26. Tropical Disturbance 11F subsequently developed to the southwest of Nadi, Fiji during January 29. The system lay to the east of an upper-level trough of low pressure within an area of high vertical windshear. During that day the system moved towards the east-southeast and was subsequently last noted by RSMC Nadi later that day as it moved into TCWC Wellingtons area of responsibility.

 During February 23, RSMC Nadi reported that Tropical Disturbance 14F had developed, within a trough of low pressure to the north-northwest of Maewo, Vanuatu. Over the next day the system moved slowly towards the south-southeast and developed into a tropical depression. Over the next two days the system continued to move towards the south-southeast and prompted heavy rain warnings for Fiji, before it dissipated during February 26. Over the next day the system moved westwards and moved into the Australian region, where it eventually developed into Tropical Cyclone Hadi during March 9. Over the next two days the system remained weak as it moved south-westwards, before it was last noted during March 8, as it moved into an area of moderate to high vertical windshear and the Australian Region. Tropical Cyclone Hadi subsequently moved back into the South Pacific basin late on March 12, where RSMC Nadi designated it as Tropical Disturbance 20F. On March 18, the Tropical Disturbance re-exited the South Pacific basin into the Australian basin.

Season effects
This table lists all the storms that developed in the South Pacific to the east of longitude 160°E during the 2013–2014 season. It includes their intensity on the Australian tropical cyclone intensity scale, duration, name, landfalls, deaths, and damages. All data is taken from RSMC Nadi and/or TCWC Wellington, and all of the damage figures are in 2014 USD.

|-
|  ||  || bgcolor=#| || bgcolor=#| || bgcolor=#| || Solomon Islands, Vanuatu || None || None ||
|-
|  ||  || bgcolor=#| || bgcolor=#| || bgcolor=#| || Kiribati, Vanuatu || None || None ||
|-
|  ||  || bgcolor=#| || bgcolor=#| || bgcolor=#| || Solomon Islands || None || None ||
|-
|  ||  || bgcolor=#| || bgcolor=#| || bgcolor=#| || Solomon Islands || None || None ||
|-
|  ||  || bgcolor=#| || bgcolor=#| || bgcolor=#| || Fiji, Tonga || None || None ||
|-
|  ||  || bgcolor=#| || bgcolor=#| || bgcolor=#| || Vanuatu || None || None ||
|-
|  ||  || bgcolor=#| || bgcolor=#| || bgcolor=#| || Fiji, Tonga ||  || 1 ||
|-
|  ||  || bgcolor=#| || bgcolor=#| || bgcolor=#| || Solomon Islands, New CaledoniaNew Zealand || Minor || 1 ||
|-
|  ||  || bgcolor=#| || bgcolor=#| || bgcolor=#| || Cook Islands, Niue, Tonga || None || None ||
|-
|  ||  || bgcolor=#| || bgcolor=#| || bgcolor=#| || Solomon Islands || None || None ||
|-
|  ||  || bgcolor=#| || bgcolor=#| || bgcolor=#| || Fiji || None || None ||
|-
|  ||  || bgcolor=#| || bgcolor=#| || bgcolor=#| || New Caledonia, New Zealand || None || None ||
|-
|  ||  || bgcolor=#| || bgcolor=#| || bgcolor=#| || Vanuatu, Fiji || None || None ||
|-
|  ||  || bgcolor=#| || bgcolor=#| || bgcolor=#| || Vanuatu, Fiji || None || None ||
|-
|  ||  || bgcolor=#| || bgcolor=#| || bgcolor=#| || Fiji, Tonga || None || None ||
|-
|  ||  || bgcolor=#| || bgcolor=#| || bgcolor=#| || Solomon Islands, Vanuatu || Unknown || None ||
|-
|  ||  || bgcolor=#| || bgcolor=#| || bgcolor=#| || Vanuatu || None || None ||
|-
|  ||  || bgcolor=#| || bgcolor=#| || bgcolor=#| || Vanuatu, Fiji, New Zealand || Unknown || 10 ||
|-
|  ||  || bgcolor=#| || bgcolor=#| || bgcolor=#| || Cook Islands || Minor || None ||
|-
|  ||  || bgcolor=#| || bgcolor=#| || bgcolor=#| || None || None || None ||
|-

See also

 Tropical cyclones in 2013 and 2014
List of South Pacific cyclone seasons
Atlantic hurricane seasons: 2013, 2014
Pacific hurricane seasons: 2013, 2014
Pacific typhoon seasons: 2013, 2014
North Indian Ocean cyclone seasons: 2013, 2014
2013–14 South-West Indian Ocean cyclone season
2013–14 Australian region cyclone season

References

External links

 
South Pacific cyclone seasons
2013 SPac
2014 SPac